On 9 September 2020, the Ethiopian region of Tigray held an election for its state council. The election was considered illegal by the federal government of Prime Minister Abiy Ahmed, who postponed the 2020 general election earlier in the year because of the COVID-19 pandemic. According to the election organisers, the Tigray People's Liberation Front won 98.2% of the vote and 100% of the 152 seats that were contested.

Electoral environment
France 24 reported aging war veterans and university students formed long lines to partake in the elections.

600 candidates from five parties competed for 152 seats in the 190 seat legislature. The distribution of the remaining 38 seats will be determined at a later date by participating parties.

The campaign featured televised debates among leaders of different parties. Opposition parties stated that while they had good access to regional media, they also faced some threats and intimidations.

Boycott
Arena Tigray boycotted the election on the grounds of "political provocations by the TPLF", the COVID-19 pandemic and what it saw as the illegitimacy of the election. The Tigray Democratic Party also stated that it would boycott the election.

Results

On 11 September 2020 the Amharic language service of the BBC reported that, of the 190 members of the state council, 152 were controlled by the TPLF and 38 were to be distributed to rival parties.

However, in local reports in September 2020, the Tigray Region state council allocated 16 seats to the four opposition parties.

References

Elections in Ethiopia
Tigray War
Tigray
2020 establishments in Tigray